Heortia is a genus of moths of the family Crambidae.

Species
Heortia dominalis Lederer, 1863
Heortia iospora (Meyrick, 1936)
Heortia iridia Munroe, 1977
Heortia ocellata (Hampson in Poulton, 1916)
Heortia plumbatalis (Zeller, 1852)
Heortia polyplagalis Hampson, 1913
Heortia vitessoides (Moore, 1885)

References

Odontiinae
Crambidae genera
Taxa named by Julius Lederer